Octavianti Dwi Nurmalita (born 25 October 1998) is an Indonesian footballer who plays as a forward for Pertiwi DIY and the Indonesia women's national team.

Club career
Octavianti has played for Pertiwi DIY in Indonesia.

International career 
Octavianti represented Indonesia at the 2022 AFC Women's Asian Cup.

International goals

References

External links

1998 births
Living people
People from Yogyakarta
Sportspeople from Special Region of Yogyakarta
Indonesian women's footballers
Women's association football forwards
Indonesia women's international footballers